Apophua is a genus of parasitoid wasps belonging to the family Ichneumonidae.

The genus was first described by Morley in 1913.

The genus has cosmopolitan distribution.

Species:
 Apophua bipunctoria
 Apophua genalis

References

Ichneumonidae
Ichneumonidae genera